Timothy Farrar Jr. (March 17, 1788 – October 27, 1874) was an American lawyer and politician who served as a judge in New Hampshire and as a member of the Massachusetts House of Representatives.

Early life
Farrar was born on March 17, 1788, in New Ipswich, New Hampshire. Farrar was the son of Chief Justice Timothy Farrar of the New Hampshire Court of Common Pleas.

Education
Farrar graduated from Phillips Academy in Andover, Massachusetts, and from Dartmouth College in 1807. Farrar read law and clerked in the office of Daniel Webster. Farrar was admitted to the New Hampshire bar at Rockingham County, New Hampshire, in 1810.

Law practice
Farrar practiced law in New Ipswich from 1810 until 1813. Farrar entered into a law partnership with Daniel Webster in Portsmouth, New Hampshire, on March 24, 1813. After Webster moved to Boston in 1816, Farrar continued to practice law in Portsmouth. In 1822 Farrar moved to Hanover, New Hampshire, where he practiced law and worked as the secretary, treasurer and librarian of Dartmouth College.

Family life
Farrar married Sarah Adams in 1817.

Political offices
Farrar represented one of Boston's Suffolk County districts in the Massachusetts House of Representatives in 1854.

Judicial career
Farrar was appointed as a judge of the New Hampshire Court of Common Pleas in 1824. Farrar remained a judge until that court was dissolved in 1833.

Death
Farrar died in Boston on October 27, 1874.

References

1788 births
Phillips Academy alumni
Dartmouth College alumni
Members of the Massachusetts House of Representatives
Politicians from Boston
New Hampshire lawyers
Politicians from Portsmouth, New Hampshire
1874 deaths
Lawyers from Boston
19th-century American politicians
19th-century American lawyers